The Punjab Colleges (also known as The Punjab Group or PGC) is a group of colleges active in Punjab, Pakistan.

It has its roots in a Commerce College set up by Mian Amer Mahmood. The chairman of PGC network is Mian Amer Mahmood. The Network laid its foundation in Lahore in 1985. Over a period of last 38 years, PGC has become the Largest Educational Network in Pakistan. PGC has head office in 123-C, Block E1, Hali Road, Gulberg III, Lahore, Pakistan.

PGC Family consists of Educational Excellence Limited, National Communications Services (SMC-Pvt.) Limited and. Tower Technologies (Pvt.) Limited. National Educational Network (Pvt.) Limited, takes care of franchising Elementary, Secondary and Higher Secondary Education across the country in the form of Schools and Colleges. Mian Amer Mahmood also launched a new television network Dunya News.

PGC as a progressive enterprise, includes 3 chartered universities, Capital University of Science & Technology – CUST in Islamabad, Mohammad Ali Jinnah University in Karachi, and University of Central Punjab in Lahore. 330 college campuses, 15 Resource Academia Schools, 700 plus Allied Schools and nearly 300 EFA Schools. PGC's National Communications Services (SMC-Pvt.) Limited owns and operates one of the Television Networks in Pakistan known as Dunya TV Network and Roznama Dunya a daily newspaper in the print media side. In 2020, Punjab Group of Colleges took another initiative by launching a 'complaint portal website' for students, their parents, teachers and all its staff members that promises to maintain the anonymity of the plaintiff.

Campus network 
 Punjab Group of Colleges, Bahawalnagar
 Punjab Group of Colleges, Dina 
 Punjab Group of Colleges, Pirmahal
 Punjab Group of Colleges, Pakpattan
 Punjab Group of Colleges, Pattoki
 Punjab Group of Colleges, Lahore
 Punjab Group of Colleges Gujranwala 
 Punjab Group of Colleges, Islamabad

 Punjab Group of Colleges, Gujrat
 Punjab Group of Colleges, Faisalabad
 Punjab Group of Colleges, Rawalpindi
 Punjab Group of Colleges, Burewala
 Punjab Group of Colleges, Rahim Yar Khan
 Punjab Group of Colleges, Sialkot
 Punjab Group of Colleges, Shorkot
 Punjab Group of Colleges, Gujranwala
 Punjab Group of Colleges, Sargodha
 Punjab Group of Colleges, Bhakkar
 Punjab Group of Colleges, Bahawalpur
 Punjab Group of Colleges, Multan
 Punjab Group of Colleges, Bilal Town Jhelum
 Punjab Group of Colleges, Gujar Khan
 Punjab Group of Colleges, Wah Cantt
 Punjab Group of Colleges, Kharian
 Punjab Group of Colleges, Abbotabad
 Punjab Group of Colleges, Attock
 Punjab Group of Colleges, Bahawalpur
 Punjab Group of Colleges, Bhalwal
 Punjab Group of Colleges, Bhimber
 Punjab Group of Colleges, Chakwal
 Punjab Group of Colleges, Chichawatni
 Punjab Group of Colleges, Chiniot
 Punjab Group of Colleges, Chishtian
 Punjab Group of Colleges, Daska
 Punjab Group of Colleges, Dera Ghazi Khan
 Punjab Group of Colleges, Gojra
 Punjab Group of Colleges, Haroonabad
 Punjab Group of Colleges, Hafizabad
Punjab Group of Colleges, Hasilpur
Punjab Group of Colleges, Hyderabad
 Punjab Group of Colleges, Jaranwala
 Punjab Group of Colleges, Jauharabad
 Punjab Group of Colleges, Jahanian
 Punjab Group of Colleges, Jhelum
 Punjab Group of Colleges, Jhang
 Punjab Group of Colleges, Kamoke
 Punjab Group of Colleges, Kasur
 Punjab Group of Colleges, Khanewal
 Punjab Group of Colleges, Kot Addu
 Punjab Group of Colleges, Layyah
 Punjab Group of Colleges, Liaquatpur
 Punjab Group of Colleges, Mailsi
 Punjab Group of Colleges, Mandi Bahauddin
 Punjab Group of Colleges, Mianwali
 Punjab Group of Colleges, Mirpur
 Punjab Group of Colleges, Narowal
 Punjab Group of Colleges, Phalia
 Punjab Group of Colleges, Sahiwal
 Punjab Group of Colleges, Samundri
 Punjab Group of Colleges, Shahkot, Pakistan
 Punjab Group of Colleges, Shakargarh
 Punjab Group of Colleges, Sheikhupura
 Punjab Group of Colleges, Toba Tek Singh
 Punjab Group of Colleges, Wazirabad
 Punjab Group of Colleges, Fateh Jang
 Punjab Group of Colleges, Fateh Pur
 Punjab Group of Colleges, Mian Channu
 Punjab Group of Colleges, Vehari
 Punjab Group of Colleges, Mailsi
 Punjab Group of Colleges Dunyapur
 Punjab Group of Colleges, Liaquatpur
 Punjab Group of Colleges, Sadiqabad
 Punjab Group of Colleges, Alipur Chatha
 Punjab Group of Colleges, Depalpur
 Punjab Group of Colleges, Pind Dadan Khan
 Punjab Group of Colleges, Zafarwal
 Punjab Group of Colleges, Ahmedpur East
 The Punjab College of Commerce and Computer Sciences, Haroonabad
 Punjab Group of Colleges, Qila Didar Singh
 Punjab Group of Colleges, Abdul hakim MHB Campus

Academic programs in Punjab College of Science 

Punjab College of Science offers intermediate programs which are listed below :

Pre-Engineering
Pre-Medical*
Computer Science
Economics/Commerce

Academic programs in Punjab College of Commerce 

Punjab College of Commerce offers intermediate programs which are listed below :

Commerce
General Science
Arts
ADP and M.com

ADP a new degree offered by Punjab Group of Colleges.

Associated institutions

Following is the information of institutions associated with the Punjab Group of Colleges:

University of Central Punjab (UCP)

The University of Central Punjab (UCP), located in Lahore, Pakistan, is a private sector university and is running under the Punjab Group of Colleges. The five colleges in the university are the faculties of Commerce, Management Studies, Information Technology, Engineering, and Law.

Mohammad Ali Jinnah University (MAJU)

Mohammad Ali Jinnah University (MAJU) is a private university in Pakistan named after Muhammad Ali Jinnah. The main campus is in Karachi; the other campus is in Islamabad. MAJU was established in 1998 after the grant of a charter by the Government of Sindh. MAJU, unlike some other institutions, which have a degree awarding status only, has a status of a comprehensive university. The university is affiliated with the Punjab Group of Colleges.

Capital University of Science & Technology

The Capital University of Science & Technology (CUST), located in Islamabad, Pakistan, is a private sector university and is running under the Punjab Group of Colleges. The university offers undergraduate and post-graduate programs with a strong emphasis on business management, applied sciences, engineering and computer science.

Hadaf Group of Colleges
An initiative of Punjab Group of Colleges, Hadaf Colleges offer quality education to both intermediate and bachelors students in Khyber Pakhtunkhwa.

Punjab College of Science
Punjab College of Science (PCS) is a medical and engineering college in Pakistan. Its head office is located in Lahore. It is running under the Punjab Group of Colleges. For students desirous of pursuing science subjects, Punjab Colleges of Science was set up in all the major cities of Punjab where students mainly study F.Sc. Pre-Engineering and Pre-Medical courses.

Punjab College of Commerce

Punjab College of Commerce (PCC) is a private commerce educational institute in Pakistan which has 39 campuses all around the country. PCC was founded in 1985 by the Punjab Group of Colleges, and now it has become the largest group of a private college in commerce and related fields.

Resource Academia

Resource Academia (RA), founded in 2003, is a private fee-paying academic institution located at Lahore, Punjab, Pakistan, as part of the W-block compound. Resource Academia provides preschool education, primary education, secondary education and preparation for General Certificate of Education (GCE). It is affiliated with the Punjab Group of Colleges.

Allied Schools

Allied Schools is a school system and a group of schools in Pakistan. This school system is working under the Punjab Group of Colleges. Its founder & chairman is Mian Amer Mahmood. It is spread all around in the Pakistan.

EFA School System

EFA School System is a school system working under the ''Punjab Group of Colleges. EFA School System is committed to provide Education For All (EFA) to children across Pakistan. EFA Schools, therefore, pledge to achieve high literacy rate by supporting to parents' affordability to educate their children. Its founder & chairman is Mian Amer Mahmood. It is spread all around in the Pakistan with 150 Branches.

Lahore Medical and Dental College
Lahore Medical & Dental College (LMDC) is committed to transforming curious minds into empowered future medicine experts and change makers by providing quality education and the best academic facilities.

Alumni 
The Punjab Group of Colleges have many notable alumni:

 Atif Aslam
 Aima Baig

See also 
University of Central Punjab
Punjab College of Business Administration
Punjab Institute of Computer Science
Punjab College of Commerce
Punjab College of Science
Punjab Law College
Mohammad Ali Jinnah University
Resource Academia
Allied Schools

References

 
Secondary education in Pakistan